Mahishadal Girls' College, established in the year 1969, is the only women's college in the Purba Medinipur district. It offers undergraduate courses in arts and sciences and is affiliated to the Vidyasagar University.

Departments
The College offers a variety of subjects under the respective departments :

Science

Chemistry
Computer Science
Physics
Mathematics
Nutrition
Physiology
Anthropology

Arts and Commerce

Bengali
English
Sanskrit
History
Geography
Political Science
Sociology
Philosophy
Education
Music
Physical Education

Three UGC Sponsored Certificate courses have been granted to the college -  PERFORMING ARTS, CLINICAL NUTRITION AND DIATETICS and TRAVEL AND TOURISM.

The College happily announces the commencement of MSW course as the first PG subject.

In addition to these, the college has the privilege of offering B. Voc. courses in "Software Development" and "Theatre and Stage Craft".

The College hosts a huge collection of books at the very calm and quiet Library. Headed by the Assistant Librarian and her commendable team of support staff, the Library offers not only books of regular subjects, but, rare and much expensive books too.

The college accommodates almosts 200 female inmates at the well equipped Hostel, the Bhagabati Debi Chhaatrinibaash.

The college has a separate NSOU building, offering various graduation and post graduation level subjects to the pupils from nearby as well as far flung areas too.

With a strength of almost 25 Full-time and 30 Part-time faculties, the college is a hub of education.

Enroute Geonkhali, a serene place on the banks of the Rupnarayan River, Mahishadal Girls' College serves its pupils at its best.

The college has a NSS and NCC Unit which holds regular camps.

Accreditation
The college is recognized by the University Grants Commission (UGC). It was accredited by the National Assessment and Accreditation Council (NAAC), and awarded B grade.

See also

References

External links
Mahisadal Girls College
Vidyasagar University
University Grants Commission
National Assessment and Accreditation Council

Colleges affiliated to Vidyasagar University
Educational institutions established in 1969
Universities and colleges in Purba Medinipur district
Women's universities and colleges in West Bengal
1969 establishments in West Bengal